Karl Grant (born 1970), is a male former weightlifter who competed for England.

Weightlifting career
Grant represented England at the 1998 Commonwealth Games in Kuala Lumpur, Malaysia and won a bronze medal in the 109 Kg clean and jerk. Four years later he won another bronze medal in the clean and jerk at the 2002 Commonwealth Games.

References

Living people
1970 births
English male weightlifters
Commonwealth Games medallists in weightlifting
Commonwealth Games bronze medallists for England
Weightlifters at the 1998 Commonwealth Games
Weightlifters at the 2002 Commonwealth Games
20th-century English people
21st-century English people
Medallists at the 1998 Commonwealth Games
Medallists at the 2002 Commonwealth Games